Semari Chauraha is a village in the Raebareli district of the Indian state of Uttar Pradesh.

Villages in Raebareli district